Lafafi is an Indian Punjabi-language television series broadcast by Jalandhar Doordarshan from 1993-94. The first episode was telecast on 16 December 1993. The serial depicts the struggle of an ordinary girl from a low class family to find a respectable place in society and in the heart and life of the person who deserts her after having seduced her.

Plot summary  
Lafafi (Neena Cheema), along with her family comprising a drunkard father (Amarjit Grover), a sick mother (Daljit Kaur) and a disabled younger brother (Saurabh Shaili), makes her living by making and selling paper bags in the local market of a small sleepy town. With less than ordinary looks, she is a not only laughing stock for the shopkeepers with whom she has to deal but also is an easy target of their vulgar remarks and advances.

Chaman (Rajinder Kashyap), owner of a grocery shop, being a person with large heart by nature, helps Lafafi financially whenever she faces a crisis. This does not mean that he has a special consideration or soft corner for her. When Lafafi's drunk father is arrested, Lafafi seeks Chaman's help in getting him released from police custody. In some moments of weakness Chaman and Lafafi become physically involved.

The local doctor (Prem Kakaria) targets Chaman when he refuses to give him bribe. To avoid being arrested for malpractice, Chaman flees from the town and joins his friend Gora (Pramod Kalia), a small-time travel agent in a metropolitan city. Chaman joins Gora's profession and due to his daring nature and enterprise prospers fast as a travel agent, now known and called by all as C.L.

When Lafafi's parents come to know that she is pregnant, they try to get rid of her by marrying her to a retarded person. Lafafi also leaves the town and somehow reaches Chaman who blatantly refuses to accept her and her child. But Lafafi does not give in and continues to fight in her own way for her rightful place in Chaman' life and the society that had never been kind to her.

Credits 
The 6 episode serial was produced and directed by Ravi Deep who also wrote the screenplay. Story and dialogs were written by Satish Sharma and Raj Kumar.

Cast 
 Neena Cheema as Lafafi
 Rajinder Kashyap as Chaman (CL)
 Pramod Kalia as Gora
 Amarjeet Grover as Lafafi's father
 Daljit Kaur as Lafafi's mother
 Saurabh Shaili as Lafafi's brother
 Sudeshna Bakshi as C.L.'s employee

References 

Indian drama television series
Television shows set in Punjab, India
1993 Indian television series debuts
1994 Indian television series endings
DD Punjabi original programming
Punjabi-language television shows